Marcantonio III may refer to:

 Marcantonio III Colonna (1585–1595) - grandson of Marcantonio II
 Marcantonio III Borghese, 5th Prince of Sulmona (1730–1800)